The 2018–19 Egyptian Handball League was the 63rd season of the Egyptian Handball League, which the team Zamalek won after an absence of two years.

League System

The 2018–19 Egyptian Handball League system happens in two phases. The first phase divides the 18 teams into two groups, with the first four teams from each group advancing to the next round.
The next round, a stage of one group, wins the most points. If both teams have the same number of points, a play-off occurs. Knowing that the teams heads of the two groups go up with four points, the seconds are two points, the third is a point and the fourth is a point.

The first stage

Group 1

Group 2

The final stage

Knowing that the teams heads of the two groups go up with four points, the seconds are two points, the third is a point and the fourth is a point
Zamalek and Al Ahly have 4 points before The final stage began.

Final Group

After the end of the final stage, Zamalek was declared the winner of the Egyptian Handball League.

Cairo Derby

The first round match of the final stage
date= Friday 1 March 2019

The second round match of the final stage
date= Sunday 28 April 2019

Resources

Handball in Egypt